Podopinae, known as turtle bugs, are a subfamily of the insect family Pentatomidae.  The type genus is Podops.

Tribes and Genera
BioLib lists:

Brachycerocorini
Auth. Davidova-Vilimova & Stys, 1993
 Bolbocoris Amyot & Serville, 1843
 Brachycerocoris Costa, 1863
 Phymatocoris Stål, 1853

Deroploini
Auth. Davidova-Vilimova & Stys, 1994
 Dandinus Distant, 1904
 Deroploa Westwood, 1835
 Deroploopsis Schouteden, 1905
 Eufroggattia Goding, 1903
 Jeffocoris Davidová-Vílimová, 1993
 Numilia Stål, 1867
 Propetestrica Musgrave, 1930
 Protestrica Schouteden, 1905
 Testrica Walker, 1867

Graphosomatini

Auth. Mulsant & Rey, 1865
 Ancyrosoma Amyot & Serville, 1843
 Asaroticus Jakovlev, 1884
 Crypsinus Dohrn, 1860
 Derula Mulsant & Rey, 1856
 Geocrypha Bergroth, 1906
 Graphosoma Laporte de Castelnau, 1833
 Hybocoris Kiritshenko, 1913
 Leprosoma Bärensprung, 1859
 Neoleprosoma Kormilev & Pirán, 1952
 Oplistochilus Jakovlev, 1887
 Parabolbocoris Schouteden, 1903
 Putonia Stål, 1872
 Sternodontus Mulsant & Rey, 1856
 Tholagmus Stål, 1860
 Tshingisella Kiritshenko, 1913
 Ventocoris Hahn, 1834
 Vilpianus Stål, 1860

Podopini
Auth. Amyot & Serville, 1843
 Allopodops Harris & Johnston, 1936
 Amaurochrous Stål, 1872
 Amauropepla Stål, 1867
 Aspidestrophus Stål, 1854
 Burrus Distant, 1908
 Coracanthella Musgrave, 1930
 Crollius Distant, 1901
 Gambiana Distant, 1911
 Haullevillea Schouteden, 1903
 Kayesia Schouteden, 1903
 Melanophara Stål, 1867
 Moffartsia Schouteden, 1909
 Neapodops Slater & Baranowski, 1970
 Notopodops Barber & Sailer, 1953
 Oncozygia Stål, 1872
 Oncozygidea Reuter, 1882
 Podops Laporte de Castelnau, 1833
 Scotinophara Stål, 1867
 Sepidiocoris Schouteden, 1903
 Severinina Schouteden, 1903
 Storthecoris Horváth, 1883
 Tahitocoris Yang, 1935
 Thoria Stål, 1865
 Tornosia Bolívar, 1879
 Weda Schouteden, 1905

Tarisini
Auth. Stål, 1872
 Cryptogamocoris Carapezza, 1997
 Dybowskyia Jakovlev, 1876
 Tarisa Amyot & Serville, 1843

Unplaced genera
 Cyptocoris Burmeister, 1845
 Eobanus Distant, 1901
 Kundelungua Schouteden, 1951
 Neocazira Distant, 1883
 Stysiellus Gapon, 2008

References

Further reading

 
 
 

 
Pentatomidae